Voicst are a three-piece indie rock band hailing from Amsterdam, The Netherlands. "Voicst" was the name of a stray cat at the band's very first practice space in Amsterdam.

Band members 
 Tjeerd Bomhof (lead vocals/guitar)
 Sven Woodside (bass/vocals)
 Joppe Molenaar (drums/samples)

Biography
Originally formed as a school band in 1994, Voicst went on hiatus until 2001, when they decided to revive their band.

In 2002, Voicst kicked off their career with a much anticipated show at the Winston in Amsterdam. After their show they were asked to support various artists, such as Millionaire, Enon, and Mclusky.

In the following years, Voicst opened for other bands like Tenacious D, The Raveonettes, and Nada Surf. Voicst built a solid live reputation and were invited to play at the Noorderslag Festival. The trio won the Essent Award in 2003, and played at major Dutch festivals like Metropolis and Lowlands. The band also traveled to New York City to perform at the CMJ Music Marathon.

Their first official release was in 2003: the six track Eat the Evidence EP, released on the independent Labelman label.

In 2004, the band journeyed back to New York for five weeks where they recorded their album, working with producer Eli Janney (Girls Against Boys), at James Iha's (Smashing Pumpkins) privately owned studio. Because of the long working days (11am to 11pm), their album was aptly titled 11-11. 11-11 was released Fall 2004 in the Netherlands, Belgium, and Spain.

The first single released from 11-11 was Dazzled Kids, and was a modest hit. Their follow-up single, Whatever You Want From Life, was used in a Heineken commercial, and was also featured in the video game 2006 FIFA World Cup.

The years after the release of their maiden album would be marked by tours and performances at the many festivals in the Netherlands; their album also won several awards. Voicst embarked on a UK and European tour, during which they supported The Bravery, The Presidents of the United States of America, Juliette and The Licks, The Posies, and others. A remastered version of 11-11 was released in the United States in 2005, followed by Australia in 2006 and Japan in 2007.

Voicst went back to the studios to record their second album A Tale of Two Devils in early 2007. They partnered with  Peter Katis (producer for Interpol and The National among others), and Rutger Hoedemaekers from the Dutch band About.

A Tale of Two Devils was released January 11, 2008, the first single Everyday I Work On The Road was released February 2, 2008.

Discography

Albums 
 11-11 (2004, Duurtlang Records)
 US re-release: 2005, Intrigue Music
 AU re-release: 2006, Cortex Records
 JP re-release: 2007, Kurofune Records
 A Tale of Two Devils (2008, Play It Again Sam/Goodbusy Records)

EPs 
 Eat The Evidence (2003, Labelman/Six-Def Recordings)

Singles 
 Sgt.Gonzo/Major Tom (7" split single w/ Buffoon; 2001, Labelman)
 Dazzled Kids (2005, Duurtlang Records)
 Whatever You Want From Life (2006, Duurtlang Records)
 Acts Of Fire (2006, Duurtlang Records)
 Everyday I Work On The Road  (2008, Play It Again Sam/Goodbusy Records)
 Feel Like A Rocket  (2008, Play It Again Sam/Goodbusy Records)
 Het is je boy feat. Dio (2008, TopNotch)
 A Year and a Bit  (2009, Intrigue Music)

External links
Voicst official website
 

Dutch rock music groups
Dutch indie rock groups